The following lists events that happened during 2000 in Armenia.

Incumbents
 President: Robert Kocharyan
 Prime Minister: Aram Sargsyan (until 12 May), Andranik Margaryan (starting 12 May)
 Speaker: Armen Khachatryan

Events

March
 March 22: Former NKR Defence Minister General Samvel Babayan leads an unsuccessful assassination attempt against president Arkadi Ghukasyan in Stepanakert.

April
 April 4: Former Interior Minister Vano Siradeghyan leaves Armenia while police investigates charges on him for murder.

September
 September 15-October 1: 25 athletes from Armenia competed at the 2000 Summer Olympics in Sydney, Australia.

References

 
2000s in Armenia
Years of the 20th century in Armenia
Armenia
Armenia
Armenia